Betws Gwerfil Goch (Standard Welsh: Betws Gwerful Goch) is a village and community in Denbighshire, Wales.  It had a population of 351 at the 2011 census.  Until 1974 it was part of Edeirnion Rural District in Meirionnydd, and was transferred to Glyndŵr District in Clwyd by the Local Government Act 1972.  It became part of Denbighshire in 1996. The community includes Melin-y-Wig village.

The village retains its primary school.

Notable people

John Edward Jones (Welsh politician)
John Sampson (linguist)

References

Villages in Denbighshire